The Ministry of War was the Government of France department responsible for the French Army, the National Gendarmerie and until 1934, the French Air Force. It existed from 25 May 1791 to  31 October 1947, date to which it was merged with the Ministry of the Navy and the Ministry of Air into the Ministry of Armed Forces (then Ministry of National Defence). It was headed by the Minister of War, occasionally taking various titles.

History 
The Ministry of War was the heir of the royal Department for War existing during the Ancien Regime. On 27 April 1791, the National Constituent Assembly issued a decree organizing the six ministries of Justice, Interior, Finances, War, Navy and Foreign Affairs. The decree was signed into law on 25 May 1791 by King Louis XVI.

The Committee of Public Safety suspended all six ministries in April 1794 and implemented instead twelve Executive Commissions ; this act dismembered the department into numerous commissions. The ministry was reinstated with the formation of the Directory in November 1795.

In 1915, during the First World War, an Under Secretariat of State of the Military Aeronautics was created. It would eventually become independent in 1928 as the Ministry of Air.

The ministry remained in place in all subsequent governments, with some temporary name changes, until its final merger with the Ministry of the Navy and the Ministry of Air into the Ministry of Defence on 31 October 1947.

Minister

Organisation

Napoleonic Wars 
During the Napoleonic Wars, the minister was organised as follows:

Ministry of War Headquarters, at the Ministry of War Building in Paris, France

 Minister of War
 Ministry of War Administration
 Intendant General of the Army (Jean François Aimé Dejean, 1802–1810; Jean-Gérard Lacuée, Comte de Cessac 1810–13; and Pierre Antoine Noël Bruno 1813–14 & 1815)
 Director General for Supplies (Augustin Louis Petiet, 1804–06; Jacques-Pierre Orillard de Villemanzy, 1806; Pierre Antoine Noël Bruno , 1806–12; Guillaume-Mathieu Dumas, 1812–14; Jean-Pierre-Paulin-Hector Daure, 1815)
 Chief Organizing Commissioners
 Gendarmerie Department
 Hospitals Department
 Transport Department
 Supplies & Rations Department
 Support Department
 Director General of Reviews of Conscription (Jean-Gérard Lacuée, Comte de Cessac, 1806–10;, Guillaume-Mathieu Dumas, 1810–12; and Étienne d'Hastrel de Rivedoux, 1812–14)
 6 x Inspectors in Chief of Reviews (Divisional Generals)
 30 x Inspectors of Reviews (Brigade Generals)
 100 x Sub-Inspectors of Reviews (Colonels)
 Assistant Sub-Inspectors, 1st Class (Chefs de Bataillons) – posts created in 1811
 Assistant Sub-Inspectors, 2nd Class (Captains)
 War Commissaires

Post-Napoleonic Wars

Footnotes

Notes

Citations

References 

 

Military of France
Government ministries of France
Lists of political office-holders in France